Zayzafun, also known as Ikadah, is a village in the northern Aleppo countryside, Aleppo Governorate, northwestern Syria.

Administratively the village belongs to Nahiya Sawran in Azaz District. Nearby localities include Kafr Ghan  to the south and Hawar Kilis  to the east. In the 2004 census, Zayzafun had a population of 820.

History
In April 2016, the Ikadah camp was filled with 7,763 IDPs, when an imminent ISIL counter-offensive prompted a complete evacuation of the Ikadah camp and neighboring camps near Shamarin and Harjala. On April 14, rebels retreated from Zayzafun and the neighboring villages down to Kafr Ghan and Baraghida, leaving the remaining rebel forces around Dudyan surrounded by ISIL.

Demographics
Ikadah is a Turkmen village. In late 19th century, traveler Martin Hartmann noted the village as a Turkish village of 10 houses, then located in the Ottoman nahiyah of Azaz-i Turkman.

References

Populated places in Azaz District
Turkmen communities in Syria